The Grand Comoro Day Gecko (Phelsuma v-nigra comoraegrandensis Meier, 1986) is a small diurnal subspecies of geckos. It lives in the Comoros and typically inhabits trees and bushes. The Grand Comoro day gecko feeds on insects and nectar.

Description 
This lizard belongs to the smallest day geckos. It can reach a maximum length of approximately 10 cm. Their bodies are bright green, which may have a blue hue. There is a red v-shaped stripe on the snout and two red bars between the eyes. On the back there often are a large number of small red-brick coloured dots which may form a faint mid dorsal stripe. The flanks are grey. There is a v-shaped marking on the throat. The ventral side is yellowish white. This lizard also does not have eyelids like all day geckos.

Distribution 
This species only inhabits the island Grand Comoro in the Comoros.

Habitat 
The Grand Comoro day gecko inhabits moist forests, palm trees and human dwellings.

Diet 
These day geckos feed on various insects and other invertebrates. They also like to lick soft, sweet fruit, pollen, and nectar.

Reproduction 
At a temperature of 28°C, the young will hatch after approximately 45 days. The juveniles measure 35 mm.

Care and maintenance in captivity 
These animals should be housed in pairs and need a medium-sized, well planted terrarium. The daytime temperature should be between 28 and 30 °C and 24 and 26 °C at night. The humidity should be around 75–90%. In captivity, these animals can be fed with crickets, wax moth larvae, fruit flies, mealworms, and houseflies.

References 
Henkel, F.-W. and W. Schmidt (1995) Amphibien und Reptilien Madagaskars, der Maskarenen, Seychellen und Komoren. Ulmer Stuttgart. 
McKeown, Sean (1993) The general care and maintenance of day geckos. Advanced Vivarium Systems, Lakeside CA.

Phelsuma
Subspecies